Ostreobium is a genus of green algae in the family Ostreobiaceae.

References

Bryopsidales genera
Taxa named by Jean-Baptiste Édouard Bornet